Mobile Estates  is the second album by Citizen King, released in 1999. It was the band's first album for a major label.

Production
The album was produced by Dave Cooley, Matt Sims, and Eric Valentine.

Critical reception
The Washington Post wrote that "even at Citizen King's most engagingly relaxed ('Jalopy Style', 'Long Walk Home'), the band just sounds like the Red Hot Beastie Spin Doctors." Rolling Stone thought that "if a finer vintage—say, Beck circa 1998—is unavailable, Citizen King are just dope and dopey enough to feed your faux funk habit." The San Antonio Express-News called the album "a tuneful, low-fi and quirky major-label debut."

Track listing 
All songs written by Matt Sims and Dave Cooley, except where noted.
 "Under the Influence" (Sims) - 4:22  
 "Better Days (And the Bottom Drops Out)"  -  3:38 
 "Safety Pin" (Sims) -  3:45 
 "Jalopy Style" -  3:11 
 "Basement Show" - 3:48  
 "Smokescreen" -  3:24   
 "The Milky Way" -  0:46  
 "Long Walk Home" -  2:58 
 "Skeleton Key" -  4:37  
 "Closed for the Weekend" (Sims) -  2:56 
 "Salt Bag Spill" -  2:15  
 "Billhilly" -  3:27 
 "Checkout Line" -  3:36

Personnel 
Matt Sims - lead vocals, bass guitar
Kristian Riley - guitar, backing vocals 
Dave Cooley - keyboards
Malcolm Michiles - turntables
DJ Brooks - drums, programming, backing vocals

References 

1999 albums
Citizen King albums
Warner Records albums